Chico Aura Dwi Wardoyo (born 15 June 1998) is an Indonesian badminton player. He was a World junior silver medalist in 2016 and Asian Championships bronze medalist in 2022. Dwi Wardoyo also part of Indonesia winning team at the 2020 Thomas Cup.

Career 
Born in Jayapura, Dwi Wardoyo started his career at the PB Pemda Papua (now PB Cendrawasih), and moved to Jakarta joining the Exist club in 2013. In 2015, he was selected to join the national team as an internship member. 

In 2016, he was selected to join Indonesia junior squad to compete at the Asian and World Junior Championships. Indonesia team was stopped in the quarter-finals in both events. In the individual event, he claimed the boys' singles silver medal after being defeated by Sun Feixiang of China. 

In May 2021, Dwi Wardoyo reached the Spain Masters finals, but he lost a match to second seed Toma Junior Popov. In October, He made his debut at the Thomas Cup, which is Indonesia won the prestigious Cup after 19 years.

In May 2022, Dwi Wardoyo won a bronze medal at the Asian Championships. In latter May, he won a bronze medal in the men's team at the Southeast Asian Games. He then claimed his first World Tour title in the 2022 Malaysia Masters. In the final, he beat Ng Ka Long of Hong Kong in straight games.

2023 
Dwi Wardoyo opened the 2023 season at the Malaysia Open, but had to defeat in the second round to Indian player Prannoy H. S.. In the next tournament, India Open, he lost in the first round from Chinese player Shi Yuqi in rubber games. Dwi Wardoyo lost the Indonesia Masters against teammate Jonatan Christie. He created an all-Indonesian final men's singles final with Christie; the first one in Indonesian Masters since 2013 final between Dionysius Hayom Rumbaka and Simon Santoso; and the first one in Istora Senayan since 2008 final between Simon Santoso and Sony Dwi Kuncoro.

In February, Dwi Wardoyo join the Indonesia national badminton team to compete at the Badminton Asia Mixed Team Championships, but unfortunately the teams lost in the quarter-finals from team Korea.

Awards and nominations

Achievements

Asian Championships 
Men's singles

BWF World Junior Championships 
Boys' singles

BWF World Tour (1 title, 2 runners-up) 
The BWF World Tour, which was announced on 19 March 2017 and implemented in 2018, is a series of elite badminton tournaments sanctioned by the Badminton World Federation (BWF). The BWF World Tour is divided into levels of World Tour Finals, Super 1000, Super 750, Super 500, Super 300, and the BWF Tour Super 100.

Men's singles

BWF International Challenge/Series (1 title, 1 runner-up) 
Men's singles

  BWF International Challenge tournament
  BWF International Series tournament

BWF Junior International (1 runner-up) 

Boys' singles

  BWF Junior International Grand Prix tournament
  BWF Junior International Challenge tournament
  BWF Junior International Series tournament
  BWF Junior Future Series tournament

Performance timeline

National team 
 Junior level

 Senior level

Individual competitions 
 Junior level

 Senior level

References

External links 
 

1998 births
Living people
People from Jayapura
Sportspeople from Papua
Indonesian male badminton players
Competitors at the 2021 Southeast Asian Games
Southeast Asian Games medalists in badminton
Southeast Asian Games bronze medalists for Indonesia
21st-century Indonesian people